¡Adios, America! The Left's Plan to Turn Our Country Into a Third World Hellhole is a 2015 book about immigration by American far-right author Ann Coulter. It was a New York Times Best Seller in the category Hardcover Nonfiction for three weeks.

Summary
The book details the ways in which Coulter believes immigration from Latin American nations negatively impacts the United States.

Nathan Evans writes that "she uses her podium to attack not just liberals, her frequent targets, but those on the right who would offer up America wholesale under the guise of compassion and diversity, resulting in the  exploitation of a more-than-willing workforce, as well as millions of new residents who will – most likely – bloc vote for Democrat candidates. That and cheap maids." Coulter claims that men who rape their underage family members are usually Hispanic.

Critical reception
Reviewing it for National Review, Jay Nordlinger called it "a serious book making serious points" and said "Her contention is that the people, or People, have long wanted a clampdown on immigration, but the elites, or Elites, have thwarted them." 

In The New York Times, Timothy Egan suggested that "Her book has influenced Trump." 

The Southern Poverty Law Center notes that she "routinely cites white nationalists, anti-Muslim activists and anti-immigrant groups" in the book.

References

2015 non-fiction books
Anti-immigration politics in the United States
Books by Ann Coulter
English-language books
Regnery Publishing books